Sweet box may refer to:

 The evergreen shrubs of the genus Sarcococca
 Sweetbox, a German pop music group